Neutral Bay ferry services (numbered F5) is a commuter ferry route in Sydney, New South Wales, Australia. Part of the Sydney Ferries network, it serves several Lower North Shore suburbs around Neutral Bay.

Services begin on the southern side of Sydney Harbour at Circular Quay, then head northeast to Kirribilli. From there, services proceed in a loop, stopping at North Sydney, Neutral Bay and Kurraba Point. The journey is completed by returning to Kirribilli and Circular Quay. Services operate every half an hour on weekdays and every hour at night and on weekends.

Wharves

Circular Quay

Circular Quay wharf is located at the northern end of the Sydney central business district. The locality of Circular Quay is a major Sydney transport hub, with a large ferry, rail and bus interchange.

Kirribilli

Kirribilli ferry wharf is located near Holbrook Avenue in Kirribilli. It consists of a single wharf.

North Sydney

North Sydney ferry wharf (also known as High Street wharf) is located at the end of High Street, North Sydney and serves the eastern part of the suburb. It consists of a single wharf.

Neutral Bay

Neutral Bay ferry wharf is located at the end of Hayes Street, Neutral Bay. It consists of a single wharf.

The wharf was rebuilt between February and August 2012.

Kurraba Point

Kurraba Point ferry wharf is located near Kurraba Road in Kurraba Point. It consists of a single wharf.

Patronage
The following table shows the patronage of Sydney Ferries network for the year ending 30 June 2022.

References

Ferry transport in Sydney